Książnice may refer to the following places:
Książnice, Lesser Poland Voivodeship (south Poland)
Książnice, Subcarpathian Voivodeship (south-east Poland)
Książnice, Świętokrzyskie Voivodeship (south-central Poland)